La Familia Burrón (The Burron Family) is a Mexican comic created in 1948 by Gabriel Vargas.
During its more than 60 years of publication, it published 500,000 copies, making it one of the longest running publications in the world. The cartoon follows the adventures of a lower-class Mexico City family with the surname Burrón (presumably a word play on the word "burro" which literally means donkey, but is widely used in Mexico as slang for dunce) it may possibly reference the use of “albures” the art of double entendres. One of the main characteristics of The Burrón Family is its excessive use of slang, contractions, or invented words in almost every dialogue, creating a particular and original invented language that is unique in the world of comics.

Origins
In the 1940s, Gabriel Vargas published a weekly comic titled Los Superlocos (Superweirdos), in which several recurrent characters were featured one at a time, in each issue. The comic focused on slices of life - comedy stories, often based in real life experiences of the lower classes of Mexico and described from a satirical point of view. Jilemón Metralla y Bomba, an old retired Mexican cacique, was one of the most popular characters in the comic; in their last years of publication, all stories were focused solely on him. The Burrons were born as a result of a bet between Vargas and Cuban screenwriter Fernando Ferrari, who challenged Vargas to create a female comic character that could be as successful and charismatic as Jilemón. Vargas accepted and presented the Burrons Family in the next issue of Superlocos, with no previous announcement to the public in December 1948. For several months, the Burrons shared the comic with Jilemón, but after the first nine months, the family become so popular that Vargas created an independent title just for them. The comic book was initially titled Paquito, and the Burrons' adventures were featured under the title A dog's life, although eventually the comic title was later changed into La Familia Burrón.

The comic was published for over 60 years, from 1948 until 2009, with additional reprints after that date, not just in comics, but also in newspapers. After Vargas's death, the comic has been continuously reprinted as paperbacks, the most notorious being the reprint from 2011-17 which collected the complete first run of the comic in 10 hardcover volumes.

Because comics in Mexico were generally considered a low-class form of entertainment, La Familia Burrón was once cataloged as a political cartoon instead, and his author Gabriel Vargas, as a satirical cartoonist, not a comic artist.

The Burrons Family
The Burrons are a typical lower-class family that lives in a neighborhood in Mexico City. The family members are Don Regino Burrón, who owns and operates a barbershop named "El Rizo de Oro" (The Golden Curly Hair), his wife Borola Tacuche, their teenage children, Macuca and Regino and the family pet, a dog named Wilson. At some point later in the series, the family also adopts a little child named Foforito Cantarranas.

Doña Borola Tacuche de Burrón 
Borola is the family boss, and main character of the cartoon. She was born to a wealthy and well known family in Mexico City. Since young she distinguished herself for being a trouble kid, getting her friends in difficulties, particularly Regino Burrón, and eventually fell in love with him, disregarding a large number of wealthy suitors to favor his "chaparrín" (little short man). Aunt Cristeta (Borola's tutor) did not fight her niece's decision.

In spite of her age, Borola regards herself as a very attractive woman, sensually walking in streets in order to show off in a way that her family, particularly her husband and daughter, find a bit shameful. She often claims she was a famous theater actress, and in more than one occasion she has come back to the "stripper" business even though the majority of her old friends regard this activity as being out of reach for her age. Being called old upsets her quite a bit, as she argues that is a "girl of the twenty first century", which gives herself permission to explore activities as varied as racing pilot, wrestling, medical surgeon or engineer.

Creative, impulsive and extroverted, she is always getting herself into trouble as she attempts to get her family out of poverty, although the truth is that the money is obtained sporadically from shady businesses that she undertakes without her husband's knowledge. Her good nature pushes her to try to help the other people in the neighborhood where she lives, who also live in great poverty, although she also often tries to take advantage of them. Borola is meant to represent the spirit and inventive nature of the Mexican.

Some of her inventions and projects include a wooden helicopter that is powered by a clothes washer motor, a cannon for traveling to space, a cable car, a sputnik built using a water container. She used her blender's motor in order to get in Earth's orbit. She created a single seat airplane to rescue her husband in Africa. In benefit of the "viejerio" (a derogative name for old people) and the dozens of "pirrimplines" (kids) that live in the neighborhood, she built an alternative subterranean transportation system so as to prevent her neighbors and their children from being run over when they try to cross streets and avenues. She has hunted zoo ostriches for her Christmas dinner, she has cooked meatballs using newspapers together with a dressing of car tires and bean parasites; she has cooked soups with car tires and rubber dust. With the help of the neighbors, she has robbed department stores and marketplaces using wrestling masks and using a musket. These are only a sample of the hundreds of adventures she has carried, the majority of which end up with injured people, such was when she decided to steal the gas from a neighboring building through a hose, causing a huge explosion. The last episode actually led Borola to jail, which she was able to skip shortly thereafter thanks to her relations with members of the "tecolotiza" (a derogatory form for the police).

Recurrent characters 
Although the main characters of the comic are the members of the Burron family, from time to time entire comics were dedicated to other recurrent secondary characters which only have in common the fact that they are somehow related to the family members, friends or even distant relatives. It may be thought of as the 1950s Scrooge McDuck's magazines whose stories were independent but related to Donald Duck's Comics. Usually, in this stories, none of the family members are included, and sometimes not even mentioned at all. The recurrent characters have adventures on their own, in a completely independent way of the mainstream, although in a few rare episodes they interact with the Burrons.

Cristeta Tacuche
Borola's wealthy aunt. She was Borola's tutor when she was a kid, but later escaped from Mexico during President Echeverría's purges and moved to France, where she lives since then. As a comparison, it is often mentioned that Rockefeller was one of her poor relatives. At times the issue focused solely on her rather than the main Burrón family.

Boba Licona
Cristeta's personal assistant. She's just a minor character in the comics, but since is always present wherever Cristeta is,  appears quite often although her participation in the stories is minimal. She's one of the few characters whose name actually means something. Her name is a mash up of "Boba" (dunce) and "Licona", a real Spanish surname, but when both words are pronounced together forms not by coincidence, the Mexican equivalent of "Dim Witt". Despite her name, she's an extremely effective assistant, that exceeds all expectations and has an extremely close relation with her boss, quite similar as Batman's butler  Alfred.

Ruperto Tacuche
He's Borola's younger brother, and is by far, considered the most complex character in the comic. When he was a kid, suffered an accident that burned his face. His family made plans to reconstruct his face in a series of medical procedures as he grow up, but he escaped from home when he was a teen, and become a thug, so he never underwent treatment for his disfigurement. Eventually reformed and now working as professional baker, become the guardian of a little paralytic boy named Robertino, who sees him as a paternal figure. The kid is also the son of his best friend and crime partner (now deceased) and his widow Bella. Ruperto and Bella eventually develops feelings for each other, but due to the prejudices of the time, they can't have an open relationship (she's a widow, his an ex-con). At the end of the series, Bella accepts hims as her official couple, but refuses to live with him unless he agrees to marry her first.

Lucila Ballenato
Initially introduced as a minor character, antagonist of Bella and possible crime partner of Ruperto, gradually becomes one of the main characters and has several comics dedicated just to her and her life. As the series progresses, becomes Bella's close friend. His brother Renato becomes a recurrent supporting character in all comics when she's the main character.

Susanito Cantarranas and La Divina Chuy
A homeless garbage catcher and biological father of Foforito, Borola's adopted son. As the series progresses, he develops a relation with a catcher woman named Chuy, who also works as stripper, despite the fact she's not attractive and overweight, eventually marrying her. They share the same economical situation and are used to represent the most abandoned and poor social class in Mexico.

The Tinocos Family
The opposite of Susanito and Chuy, they are an extremely wealthy family composed by Titino, his wife and their son, Floro aka "The Truck". Usually, the entire action is focused in Floro's activities, being a selfish high school junior, with his father as support character. Floro's mother plays a minimal role, and sometimes is not even present or mentioned, as the main focus of these stories is the tense relation between Tinoco and Floro which usually revolve around the mishap of money.

Doña Gamucita Botello
She's notorious for being one of the few main characters that have no relationship or interaction at all with any other character in the comic, except for living in the same block. She was included in the mainstream to represent and criticize the selfless and suffered mother that gives everything for her son, a common Mexican stereotype of the date. She's a widow of advanced age who has a totally useless hippie son named Avelino Pilongano which basically does nothing (although he insists he's a Poet), except live at her mother's expense and has sex.

Kakiko Kukufate from Karakatiako
An alien from Mars who occasionally comes to Earth to visit Borola and know more about Earthlings. His name has no meaning at all, is just a tongue twister made by joining as many k phonemes as possible. However, the pronunciation of his name sounds suspiciously similar as many province locations in Mexico, which adds a touch of credibility to his unusual name.

Colloquial language
Gabriel Vargas has been recognized and praised for the amusing use of language in Burron's comics. Using a unique combination of slang, popular expressions, Prehispanic terms, colloquial and contracted or even invented words, all mixed together, Vargas created a unique language in which basically every single common word of our language has a strange and unusual equivalent in the Burron's universe. Even the minimal and most insignificant details are described with this needlessly complex and fun invented language. For example, the home of the family is placed in Mexico City, but in a fictitious location in "chorrocientos chochenta y chocho, Callejón del Cuajo ". The number itself has no meaning in Spanish - it is a word play using many Ch phonemes evoking large quantities (chorrocientos is a juxtaposition of "chorro" which means "lots" and "cientos" which means "hundreds") and a variation of the number 88 (ochenta y ocho). So, basically the family lives somewhere in "many hundreds plus 88 Rennet Alley".

Same applies for parts of the body. For example, Vargas often used the expression "los de apipizca" instead of just say "eyes". Apipizca is really an obscure reference to a migratory water bird whose eyes at first sight have the appearance of being irritated, using the original Nahuatl name of that bird, "apipixca". Other unnecessarily long and complex phrases frequently used included "las de sopear" -the ones used to eat soup- instead of "hands" or "las de galopar" -the ones used to gallop- instead of "legs".

Professions, activities, streets names, cities, vehicles, objects and even animals are described this way.
Most characters in the comic also have names that follows the same pattern. "Cantarranas" -Frogsinger-, "Boba Licona" -Dimwit-, "Gamucita Botello" -Lil'Bottled Suede - are a few examples of the kind of names, usually with no real meaning, that can be found in the comic.
For their unusual use of the language, La Familia Burrón has been object of anthropological studies, essays and dissertations by several universities and language academies around the world.

Public recognition
La Familia Burron is considered one of the most representative comics of Mexican popular culture of all times. It is often cited as a social chronicle of the decades from the 1950s to 1970s.

References

Bibliography
Vargas, Gabriel (2002–2006) La familia Burrón, 10 tomos con 12 ejemplares cada uno, Ed. Porrúa, México.

External links 
 
 Una entrevista al creador de La Familia Burrón, Gabriel Vargas, publicada en la revista semanal Etcétera.

1948 comics debuts
Comics characters introduced in 1948
Mexican comics titles
Humor comics
Satirical comics
Slice of life comics
Fictional families
Comics about married people
Comics set in Mexico
Comics set in the 1940s
Comics set in the 1950s
Comics set in the 1960s
Comics set in the 1970s